The Hancock Bridge was a bridge in Mumbai located between the Suburban railway stations of Sandhurst Road and Byculla. The bridge was initially built in 1879 and then underwent reconstruction in 1923 before it was demolished in January 2016 for another reconstruction.

History 
Hancock Bridge was first built in 1879 during the British India era. It was named after Colonel H. F. Hancock, who served as member and President of the then Bombay Municipal Corporation (presently the Municipal Corporation of Greater Mumbai) during that period. The bridge was then rebuilt in 1923.

After demolition in 2016, Hancock Bridge will again be rebuilt by the MCGM while preserving some of its old structures.

Demolition 
The demolition plan had been on papers since 2014 as the bridge had become weak and thus limited traffic was permitted. The Municipal Corporation of Greater Mumbai (MCGM) and Central Railway at the same time stated their intentions to preserve old structures and thus the demolition and reconstruction was being planned accordingly. In 2014, it was confirmed that MCGM would pay for the demolition and reconstruction. Demolition of the Hancock Bridge began in November 2015 and the bridge has been closed for pedestrian traffic since then.

References 

Rail transport in Mumbai
Bridges completed in 1879
Bridges in Maharashtra
Former bridges in India
Railway bridges in India
Former railway bridges in India